Tuomo Tuormaa (27 October 1926 in Sortavala – 25 February 2010) was a Finnish sprint canoeist who competed in the early 1950s. He was eliminated in the heats of the C-2 1000 m event at the 1952 Summer Olympics in Helsinki.

References
Tuomo Tuormaa's profile at Sports Reference.com

1926 births
2010 deaths
People from Sortavala
Canoeists at the 1952 Summer Olympics
Finnish male canoeists
Olympic canoeists of Finland